Tomb Robber is a 2014 Chinese action adventure suspense thriller film directed by Yu Dao. It was released on December 5, 2014.

Cast
Michael Tong
Miya Muqi
Li Bingyuan
Li Tao
Guo Da
Zhang Shan

Reception

Box office
By December 8, 2014, the film had earned ¥5.04 million at the Chinese box office.

References

Chinese action adventure films
Chinese suspense films
Chinese action thriller films
2014 action thriller films